The short boarfish (Parazanclistius hutchinsi), also known as Hutchin's boarfish, is a species of marine ray-finned fish, an armourhead from the family Pentacerotidae. It is endemic to the southern coast of Western Australia.

References

Pentacerotidae
Fish described in 1983